This is a list of the main career statistics of Polish professional tennis player Hubert Hurkacz. All statistics are according to the ATP World Tour and ITF websites.

Performance timelines

Singles
Current through the 2023 Indian Wells.

Doubles

Significant finals

Masters 1000 finals

Singles: 2 (1 title, 1 runner-up)

Doubles: 2 (2 titles)

ATP Tour career finals

Singles: 7 (6 titles, 1 runner-up)

Doubles: 5 (4 titles, 1 runner-up)

Challenger and Futures finals

Singles: 9 (5–4)

Doubles: 7 (3–4)

Junior Grand Slam finals

Doubles: 1 (1 runner–up)

Head-to-head records

Record against top 10 players
Hurkacz's ATP-only record against players who have been ranked world No. 10 or higher, with active players in boldface.

Wins over top 10 players
Hurkacz has a  record against players who were, at the time the match was played, ranked in the top 10.

statistics correct

See also 

 Poland Davis Cup team

References

External links
 
 Hubert Hurkacz at the ITF profile
 

Hurkacz, Hubert
Polish tennis players
Tennis in Poland